This is a list of incumbents and former vice-chancellors of universities in Nigeria.

A–M

 Cordelia Agbebaku
 Charity Angya
 Osita Chinedu Nebo, former Vice Chancellor of University of Nigeria, Nsukka 
Celestine Onwuliri  (born 17 February 1952 - 3 June 2012)  professor of Zoology, former Acting Vice-Chancellor of University of Jos and former Vice-Chancellor of Federal University of Technology, Owerri
 Babatunde Kwaku Adadevoh (October 1933 October 1997) physician
 Akinpelu Oludele Adesola (born 1927) professor of surgery
 Ekanem Ikpi Braide
 Friday Okonofua, the pioneer Vice Chancellor of Ondo State University of Medical Sciences
 Abubakar Kundiri, Vice Chancellor of Federal University, Wukari, Taraba State
 John Obafunwa  pathologist, former Vice-Chancellor of Lagos State University
 J. F. Ade Ajayi (26 May 1929 – 9 August 2014) historian
 Joseph Atubokiki Ajienka (born 10 January 1955)  professor of petroleum engineering
 Fatiu Ademola Akesode (born 1940) professor of paediatrics
Isaac Folorunso Adewole
 Nurudeen Oladapo Alao professor of geography
 Charles Ayo
 Oluwafemi Olaiya Balogun (born 1953) professor of biochemistry
 Ladipo Ayodeji Banjo (born 2 May 1934) emeritus professor of English language
 Rahmon Ade Bello (born October 1948) professor of chemical engineering
 Saburi Biobaku (1918–2001) scholar and historian
 Kenneth Dike (17 December 1917 26 October 1983) historian and emeritus professor
 Micheal Oladimeji Faborede (born September 1956) professor of agricultural engineering
 Oyewusi Ibidapo-Obe (born July 1951) professor of systems engineering
 Attahiru Jega academic
 Thomas Adeoye Lambo (29 March 1923 13 March 2004) scholar, administrator and psychiatrist
 Nahzeem Olufemi Mimiko (born May 1960) educational administrator and professor of international relations
 Bashiru Ademola Raji
 Adewale Oke Adekola (1932 - 1999) professor of civil engineering.
 Felix Kolawole Salako (1961 -) Professor of Soil Science, Current Vice-Chancellor, Federal University of Agriculture, Abeokuta (FUNAAB)
 Bello Bako Dambatta (1995 -1999) Vice-Chancellor of Bayero University, Kano

N–Z

Abel Idowu Olayinka
 Eni Njoku (born 1917)
 Aize Obayan (born March 1960) professor of counselling
 Bashiru Ademola Raji
 Tolu Olukayode Odugbemi (born 30 January 1945) professor of medical microbiology and parasitology
 Jacob K. Olupona professor of African religious traditions
 Idowu Bantale Omole (born September 1954) professor of international relations
 Jelili Adebisi Omotola (1941–2006) professor of property law
 Oyeleye Oyediran
 Olusola Bandele Oyewole (born 1955) professor of food science and technology
 Abdulmumini Hassan Rafindadi (born 15 January 1957) professor of pathology
 Abubakar Sani Sambo, OON (born 31 July 1955) mechanical engineer; director-general, Energy Commission of Nigeria
 Babatunde Adetokunbo Sofoluwe  (15 April 1950 May 2012) computer scientist
 Tekena Tamuno (born 1932) historian
 Orishejolomi Thomas (1917–1979) academic
 Osarhieme Osadolor Professor of history and International studies
 Oyewale Tomori (born 3 February 1946) professor of virology
 Sonni Gwanle Tyoden (born 22 September 1950) professor of political science; former vice-chancellor, University of Jos
 Ibrahim Umar scientist and university administrator; vice-chancellor, Bayero University (1979–1986)

See also

 List of Nigerians
 List of universities in Nigeria
 Lists of university leaders
List of Private Universities in Nigeria

References

 Vice chancellors
Nigeria
Nigeria